Lene Aanes (born 18 July 1976) is a Norwegian sport wrestler. She became European Champion in 2003, and has won several medals at the FILA Wrestling World Championships. She was World Champion in sumo wrestling in 2000 and in 2001.

References

1976 births
Norwegian female sport wrestlers
Living people
World Wrestling Championships medalists
20th-century Norwegian women
21st-century Norwegian women